Mohamed Rached Meddeb (born 22 October 1940) is a Tunisian former footballer who played as a midfielder for Espérance Tunis. He also played for the Tunisian national team, and was selected to play for the team in the 1960 Summer Olympics.

References

External links
 

1940 births
Footballers from Tunis
Living people
Tunisian footballers
Tunisia international footballers
Olympic footballers of Tunisia
Footballers at the 1960 Summer Olympics
1962 African Cup of Nations players
Espérance Sportive de Tunis players
Association football midfielders